Arthur Richard Burrows FJI (15 February 1882  – 26 November 1947), known as "Uncle Arthur" to listeners, was one of the earliest employees of the British Broadcasting Company and was the first to hold the position of Director of Programmes. Burrows was previously a journalist who began his career on the Oxford Times newspaper, obtaining the post through the editor Claude Rippon. Burrows knew Rippon through the Oxford Camera Club; both were keen photographers.

Burrows was also a keen wireless enthusiast. Prior to joining the BBC he was in charge of the original experimental transmissions from Marconi House, the first 2LO station.

Arthur Burrows was a man of several British broadcasting 'firsts':

 At 6pm on 14 November 1922, he read the BBC's first-ever, on-air news bulletin.
 At 5pm on 24 December 1922, he played Father Christmas in the play 'The Truth About Father Christmas' – considered to be the first official broadcast of a radio drama.
 He was one of the original BBC 'Uncles' ('Uncle Arthur'), the first London wireless Uncle on Children's Hour.

At 2LO and the BBC, he was assisted by L. Stanton Jefferies - the latter's first Director of Music.

After the BBC, Burrows went on to be head of the International Wireless Bureau in Geneva.

He was a Fellow of the Institute of Journalists (FJI).

References

BBC Programme Records 1922–1926.
BBC Year Book 1930.
The Story of Broadcasting, A.R. Burrows, 1924.

1882 births
1947 deaths
British radio personalities
BBC people
Children's Hour presenters
People from Oxford
Fellows of the Institute of Journalists